{{Infobox person
| name        = Derrick Davenport
| image       = Derrick Davenport during fun photo session in L.A. in 2006.jpg
| caption     = 
| birth_name  = 
| birth_date  = 
| birth_place = Greenwood, South Carolina, United States
| death_date  = 
| death_place = 
| death_cause = 
| resting_place = 
| resting_place_coordinates = 
| nationality = American
| other_names = Derrick Greenleaf
| known_for   = Playgirls 2006 Man of the Year
| education   = 
| employer    = 
| occupation  = Model, personal trainer
| title       = 
| height      = 
| term        = 
| predecessor = 
| successor   = 
| party       = 
| boards      = 
| spouse      = 
| partner     = 
| children    = 
| parents     = 
| relatives   = 
| signature   = 
| website     = www.derrickdavenport.com
| footnotes   = 
}}Derrick Davenport''' (born January 14, 1978) is an American porn male model, best known for being Playgirl's 2006 Man of the Year.

Filmography

Bibliography (selection)
Anthology, Henning von Berg (Un)Dressed to Thrill, Studio Publications, Sydney, 2006, 
Henning von Berg Alpha Males, Bruno Gmuender Verlag, Berlin, 2007, 
Anthology, Dianora Niccolini Night Visions'', Bruno Gmeunder, Berlin 2008,

References

External links
 LustCorp.com 
Official website
 

1978 births
American male adult models
Living people
People from Greenwood, South Carolina
Playgirl Men of the Month
Playgirl Men of the Year